The Madagascar ibis (Lophotibis cristata), also known as the Madagascar crested ibis, white-winged ibis or crested wood ibis, is a medium-sized (approximately 50 cm long), brown-plumaged ibis. It has bare red orbital skin, yellow bill, red legs, white wings and its head is partially bare with a dense crest of green or gloss blue and white plumes on the nape. The Madagascar ibis is the only member of the genus Lophotibis.

Taxonomy
The Madagascar ibis was described by the French polymath Georges-Louis Leclerc, Comte de Buffon in 1781 in his Histoire Naturelle des Oiseaux from a specimen collected on the island of Madagascar. The bird was also illustrated in a hand-coloured plate engraved by François-Nicolas Martinet in the Planches Enluminées D'Histoire Naturelle which was produced under the supervision of Edme-Louis Daubenton to accompany Buffon's text.  Neither the plate caption nor Buffon's description included a scientific name but in 1783 the Dutch naturalist Pieter Boddaert coined the binomial name Tantalus cristatus in his catalogue of the Planches Enluminées. The Madagascar ibis is now the only species placed in the genus Lophotibis that was erected by the German naturalist Ludwig Reichenbach in 1853. The name of the genus combines the Ancient Greek lophos meaning "crest" and ibis; the specific epithet cristata is from the Latin crustatus meaning "crest".

Description
The head is black and the upper parts are rufous brown. The chin, neck and throat and underparts are dark brown and the wing largely white. Part of the face is naked and red, including round the eye, and the crown and back of the neck bear a crest of long feathers which are black with a metallic sheen. In the subspecies L. c. cristata, the sheen is green and there are flecks of white; in the subspecies L. c. urschi, the throat, neck and crest have a greenish sheen mixed with yellowish-orange, and the body colour is darker chestnut. The iris is brown, the very long beak is horn-coloured and the legs and feet are red.

Distribution and habitat
It is found in both primary and secondary forest, including humid forest in the northeast of the island and dry forests in the west and south.

Ecology
Its diet consists mainly of insects, spiders, frogs, reptiles, snails and invertebrates. The female usually lays three eggs in a platform nest made from twigs and branches.

Status
The total population of this ibis is thought to be declining due to ongoing habitat loss, and overhunting in some areas, it being a favourite quarry. The bird is evaluated as being a near-threatened species on the IUCN Red List of Threatened Species.

References

External links 
 BirdLife species factsheet

Madagascar ibis
Endemic birds of Madagascar
Madagascar ibis